Volturino is a village and comune in the province of Foggia, in the Apulia region of southern Italy.
 
The village is bordered by Alberona, Lucera, Motta Montecorvino, Pietramontecorvino, Volturara Appula.

References

External links
Official website

Cities and towns in Apulia